Josef Dvorak is an Austrian therapist, Catholic theologian (scholar of Karl Rahner), author, and co-founder of the Viennese Actionism.

Work 
For several years, Dvorak worked as a journalist for the Viennese newspapers Kurier and Arbeiter-Zeitung. At least from the beginning of the 1960s, Dvorak worked in Vienna as a therapist. In this time he also got to know Otto Muehl, who conducted a conversation analysis on Dvorak. At the end of the 1960s, Dvorak was an important intellectual source of inspiration for the left-winged Viennese student scene.

End of the 1970s, Dvorak claimed to have had an encounter with Satan while under the influence of LSD. After that, Dvorak retreated into a farmhouse in the Lower Austrian Waldviertel and began celebrating “Satanic masses with plenty of naked flesh and blood” („Satanische Messen mit viel nacktem Fleisch und Blut“ )

In the 1980s, Dvorak celebrated a modification of English occultist Aleister Crowley’s Missa Phoenix in Burgenland and in Bremen. These happenings have been broadcast on Austrian television and gained Dvorak the reputation of being close to Satanism himself.

Today, Dvorak calls himself a “Satanologist” and, as a free researcher and publicist, is particularly engaged in the history of psychoanalysis and the occult. In 1989 he wrote a book “Satanismus. Schwarze Rituale, Teufelswahn und Exorzismus, Geschichte und Gegenwart.” (“Satanism. Black rituals, devil obsession and exorcism, past and present”).

Literature 
 Josef Dvorak: Satanismus. Schwarze Rituale, Teufelswahn und Exorzismus, Geschichte und Gegenwart. Heyne, Munich, 1989.

References 

1934 births
Living people

20th-century Austrian Roman Catholic theologians
21st-century Austrian Roman Catholic theologians